Deloncle is a French surname. It may refer to:

People

 Eugène Deloncle (1890–1944), French engineer and Fascist leader
 François Deloncle (1856–1922), French orientalist, journalist and politician

Other

 Deloncle Bay, bay in Graham Land, Antarctica, named after François Deloncle